Capanema may refer to:
Capanema, Pará, Northern region of Brazil
Capanema, Paraná, South Region of Brazil
Capanema River